Chang'an Automobile Co., Ltd. is a Chinese state-owned automobile manufacturer headquartered in Jiangbei, Chongqing. Founded in 1862, it is China’s oldest automobile maker. It is currently the smallest of the "Big Four" state-owned car manufacturers of China, namely: SAIC Motor, FAW Group, Dongfeng Motor Corporation, and Changan Automobile, with car sales of 5.37 million, 3.50 million, 3.28 million and 2.30 million in 2021 respectively.

The company produces and sells vehicles under its own branding, such as Changan, Oshan, Kaicene, as well as under foreign-branded joint ventures such as Changan-Ford and Changan-Mazda. In 2021, domestic branded cars took over 76% of sales (1.75m, 1.2m passenger vehicles).

Its principal activity is the production of passenger cars, microvans, commercial vans and light trucks.

It is China's second most popular car brand, with 1.4 million Changan cars sold in 2016. A subsidiary of Changan, Chongqing Changan Automobile Company, is listed on the Shenzhen Stock Exchange (but is also state controlled).

History
Changan's early origins can be traced back to 1862 when Li Hongzhang set up a military supply factory, the Shanghai Foreign Gun Bureau. It is China’s oldest automobile maker. In 1937, during the Second Sino-Japanese War, the factory was moved to Chongqing when Shanghai was invaded and bombed.

In 1959 a predecessor entity, Chongqing Chang'an Arsenal, under contract to the government, began auto manufacturing and built Changjiang Type 46 vehicle which was the first production vehicle of China. Changan introduced minicar by licensing from Suzuki.

In 2009, Changan acquired two smaller domestic automakers, Hafei and Changhe. In 2013, Changhe was transferred to Jiangxi provincial government for restructuring, and later became a majority-owned subsidiary of another Chinese automaker BAIC Group.

As of 2010, China Weaponry Equipment is the parent company of this state-owned automaker, and that year Chang'an became the fourth most-productive car manufacturer in the Chinese automobile industry by selling 2.38 million units.

The company also released a new logo for its consumer offerings in 2010 while commercial production retains the former red-arch brand.

Although it only allowed the company to achieve fourth place among domestic automakers in terms of production, Changan made over 2 million whole vehicles in 2011.

In 2012, it was reported that 72% of production was dedicated to passenger vehicles, but this count likely conflates private offerings and microvans, tiny commercial trucks and vans that are popular in China.

In November 2012, Changan Ford Mazda Automobile was divided into two new joint venture companies: Changan Ford and Changan Mazda.

Changan plans to cease production of vehicles powered solely by internal-combustion engines by 2025. The automaker will only sell plug-in hybrid vehicles and all-electric vehicles from 2025 as a result. The company stated that this is because Government of China announced that it has passed legislation that will ban new ICE-powered vehicles by the mid 2030s, due to high air pollution and due to China's reiterated commitment in the United Nations Paris Agreement as the automaker wants remain compliant with the government's automotive emission standards. The automaker is joining Volvo Cars, Jaguar Land Rover, Hongqi, BYD Auto, Lotus Cars, and several other automakers in planning on ceasing production of ICE-powered vehicles in the coming years.

Changan said it plans to launch 21 electric cars in the 2021–2025 period, increasing its sales of that kind of vehicles to over 1 million units.

Brands and products
Changan produces and markets vehicles primarily under three brands:

 Changan for premium SUVs and passenger cars
 Shenlan for electric vehicles
 Oshan (frequently transliterated as Auchan, Ossan, or Oushan) for mid-level SUVs and MPVs
 Kaicene for the commercial vehicles, light trucks, and MPVs

Changan also develops premium electric vehicles under the Shenlan brand from 2022, with the first vehicle of the brand being the SL03, codenamed C385 during development phase.

The group previously launched another premium electric vehicle brand in conjunction with Huawei and CATL called Avatr in the end of 2021.

Changan

Current models 
 Changan BenBen / BenBen EV
 Changan CS15 / CS15 EV
 Changan CS35
 Changan CS35 Plus
 Changan CS55
 Changan CS55 Plus
 Changan CS75
 Changan CS75 Plus
 Changan CS85
 Changan CS95
 Changan UNI-T
 Changan UNI-K
 Changan UNI-V
 Changan Alsvin
 Eado DT
 Eado / Eado Blue / Eado EV
 Eado XT / Eado XT RS
 Changan Linmax
 Changan Lumin
 Changan Raeton Plus

Former models
 Alsvin Hatchback
 Alsvin Sedan
 Alsvin V3
 Alsvin V5
 Benni Love (Extended production version of the first-generation Benni)
 Benni Mini (Extended production version of the second-generation Benni)
 CX20 (Now built by Youngman Lotus)
 CV7
 CX30 Hatchback (CV8)
 CX30 Sedan (CV8)
 E30 EV
 Changan SC6320G/Changan SC1011 (rebadged Suzuki Carry vans and trucks)
 Joice (Jiexun)
 Joice HEV (Hybrid electric version of the Joice, out of production within one year of market launch)
 Z-Shine
 CM5 (Rebadged Chana Star)
 CM6 (长安运通)
 CM7 (长安镭蒙)
 CM8
 Changan Raeton
 Eulove

Changan Shenlan
Vehicles using Changan EPA NEV platform, separated into EPA0, EPA1 and EPA2. Five initial models will be released, 1 based on EPA0 and 4 based on EPA1.

Current models
Shenlan SL03 - D segment sedan based on Changan EPA1 NEV platform.
Shenlan S7 - D segment crossover SUV based on Changan EPA1 NEV platform.

Changan Oshan

Current models 
 Oshan COS1°
 Oshan COS1° GT
 Oshan COS3°
 Oshan COS5°
 Oshan X5
 Oshan Z6
 Oshan X7
 Oshan Cosmos
 Oshan Changxing
 Oshan X70A
 Oshan CX70
 Oshan CX70T
 Oshan Qiyue

Changan Kaicene

Current models
 Raesor (Ruixing) ES30
 Raesor (Ruixing) S50
 Raesor (Ruixing) S50T
 Raesor (Ruixing) M60 / Raesor (Ruixing) EM60
 Raesor (Ruixing) M70
 Raesor (Ruixing) M80 (Changan G10)/ Raesor (Ruixing) EM80
 Raesor (Ruixing) M90
 Star 3
 Star 5
 Star Truck/ Star truck EV
 Star Truck C-type/ Star truck L1
 Star 9/ Star 9 EV
 Shenji T10/ Shenji T10 EV
 Shenji T20
 Shenji T30
 F30
 F70
 A800
 A600 (Originally Changan Oushang)
 Honor (欧诺)

Former models
 Ruiline
 Shenqi T20 / Q20
Shenji F50
 Kaicene Zunxing
 Chana Star
 Chana Star 2
 Chana Star 7 (Formerly Taurustar)
 Chana Star 9 (Formerly Chana Star 4500)
 Chana Star S460
 Changan Zunxing

Sales

Joint ventures
Like most major Chinese automakers, Changan partners with Western and Japanese companies to produce and sell the products of these foreign firms in China. It also partners with other companies within China to augment manufacturer capacity and share development costs.

Changan currently participates in the following joint ventures:

Changan Ford (2001–present)

In 2001, Chang'an Ford was formed and initially built Ford-branded passenger vehicles from complete knock down kits.

Making Chinese-market versions of Ford consumer offerings, its 2010 dealer network was thought to include many showrooms in second- and third-tier Chinese cities such as Chongqing. So-called second- and third-tier cities are large and medium-sized cities not among the top four in terms of population and contribution to GDP.

Changan Mazda (2012–present)

Changan Kuayue
Chongqing Kuayue Automobile is a co-operative venture between Changan and Chongqing Kuayue Group specializing in commercial vehicle production.

The group builds commercial vehicles for Changan primarily under the Kuayue and Kaicene brands.

Kuayue commercial vehicles rebranded as Mamut in former Soviet countries.

Current models 
 Kuayue D5
 Kuayue T3
 Kuayue Chana V3 / V3 Electric
 Kuayue Chana V5
 Kuayue X1
 Kuayue X3
 Kuayue X5
 Kuayue Kuayuexing V3/V5/V7

Former models 

 Kuayue Xinbao Mini
 Kuayue Xunlong

Avatr Technology

Avatr Technology is a replacement for the Changan-Nio New Energy Automotive Technology joint-venture (with Nio), with battery provider CATL and Huawei involved instead. In November 2021, the firm revealed an electric SUV called the Avatr 11.

Jiangling Motors 

Jiangling Motor Holding Co. Ltd., also known by the initialism JMH,  was a joint venture established in October 2004 and controlled equally by Changan and JMCG. To create Jiangling Motor Holding Changan invested money and in exchange JMCG transferred its Jiangling Motors Corporation (JMC) equity to the venture. Jiangling Motor Holding was the largest shareholder of JMC, with a 41.03% stake as of March 2018. JMH also owned the Landwind marque.

In April 2019, it was announced that JMCG and Changan planned to split JMH into two separate companies: one keeping the same name and other tentatively called Jiangling Investment. Jiangling Investment would hold the 41.03% JMC stake and some liabilities and would still be equally owned by Changan and JMCG. The new JMH would own the rest of the former JMH assets (including Landwind) and it would issue 100% more shares to be sold to investors, leaving JMCG and Changan with a 25% stake each. Jiangling Investment was formally established in May 2019, completing the split of the former JMH. In June 2019, it was announced that the investor for the new JMH was the car manufacturer Aiways. Aiways acquired a 50% of the new JMH with the aim of securing production permits for new energy vehicles.

Former

Changan PSA

Changan and the French car manufacturer PSA Peugeot Citroën agreed in 2010 to set up a 50/50 passenger car and light commercial vehicle-making joint venture. Named CAPSA, it was the PSA Group's second joint venture company in China, after Dongfeng Peugeot-Citroën Automobile, and its first with Chang'an. Centering on a newly built production base in Shenzhen, it was estimated that initial production capacity for the project will be 200,000 units/year. Manufacturing commenced in 2014, with China specific Citroën DS models; the DS 5LS first and then the DS 6WR. The venture was dissolved in 2020.

Changan Suzuki

Technical and commercial cooperation with Suzuki Motors, beginning in 1983, saw Changan assembling inexpensive commercial trucks (originally the Suzuki Carry ST90 as the Chang'an SC112) under license into the 2000s. The two companies formed Chongqing Chang'an Suzuki Automobile Co in 1993, which built licensed versions of the Suzuki Alto, Suzuki Cultus, and more recently the Swift.

In parallel with its Suzuki joint venture, Changan also continued to build small trucks and vans for commercial use based on the 1999 Suzuki Carry license, but independently developed vehicles are quickly replacing them. These small cars carry the Changan brand name although Suzuki technology is used in their design and manufacture.

On 4 September 2018, Suzuki transferred its 50 percent stake in Changan Suzuki to Chang'an Automobile Group, ending 25 years of joint venture. Under the plan, Chang'an would continue to make and sell Suzuki-branded cars in China under license.

In 2021, Changan Suzuki was renamed to Chongqing Lingyao Automobile.

Production and research facilities

Domestic
Changan has four major production bases (in the City of Chongqing, Hebei province, Jiangsu province, and Jiangxi province), eleven automobile production bases, and two engine production bases in mainland China for a more-current total of 21 vehicle-making bases including newer sites in Anhui province, Guangdong province, Heilongjiang province, Shandong province, and Shanxi province.

Anhui
A planned 300,000 units/year capacity mini-vehicle production base in Hefei, Anhui province, should see completion in 2011. Production capacity figures may consider engines and vehicles as discrete.

Beijing
An existing R&D center in Beijing will soon be joined by a passenger car production base in Fangshan District, Beijing, which will become operational in 2012.

Chongqing
Chang'an has numerous sites in the city of Chongqing. A Chang'an-Ford plant and another, planned Chang'an-Ford plant (which may produce engines) are joined by a Chongqing-based R&D center and an industrial park in Yubei, Chongqing.

Hebei
An industrial park in Hebei province may continue to be Chang'an controlled.

Heilongjiang
A Harbin, Heilongjiang province, R&D center, is now a Chang'an asset. It may have been owned by Hafei prior.

Jiangsu
A Chang'an-Ford plant and an industrial park in Nanjing, Jiangsu province, may comprise Chang'an operations in this province.

Jiangxi
A planned Chang'an commercial vehicle production base in Nanchang, capital of Jiangxi province, will produce JMC and Ford-branded vehicles and join an R&D center as a second facility in this province. The latter facility may be a former Changhe asset.

Shanghai
Chang'an has an R&D center in this coastal city.

International
The company maintains four factories in international markets and several overseas R&D centers.
Chang'an had an assembly plant in Poteau, Oklahoma, piecing together products sold under the Tiger Truck brand from 2007 to 2010. The Changan CS35 is built in Lipetsk region of Russia since 2016. Also Changan vans and pickup trucks were assembled at Ganja Auto Plant in Ganja city, Azerbaijan in 2005.

Karachi

Changan has built a production facility in Karachi Pakistan. A joint venture with Master Motors with an investment of US$100 million. This plant will make right hand drive passenger vehicles for Pakistan as well other right hand drive markets. First Made in Pakistan unit of Changan rolled out on 2 May 2019. With a manufacturing capacity of 30,000 cars per year this facility will be Changan's first to produce right hand drive cars.

R&D centers
Chang'an has over 7,000 engineers and researcher working in R&D facilities in Chongqing, Beijing, Shanghai and Harbin, Turin, Italy, and Yokohama, Japan. It set up two more in 2011. These are located in Birmingham (originally was set up in Nottingham), United Kingdom, and Detroit, United States. The Detroit center opened in early 2011, and its office was moved to Plymouth 2015.

Notes

References

External links

  
 Global Changan 
 China’s Changan and Master Motor to set up auto plant in Karachi article at The Express Tribune

 
Companies in the CSI 100 Index
Companies listed on the Shenzhen Stock Exchange
Vehicle manufacturing companies established in 1862
Car manufacturers of China
Electric vehicle manufacturers of China
Government-owned companies of China
Chinese brands
Companies based in Chongqing
Truck manufacturers of China
Chinese companies established in 1862